The 2014–15 KHL Medveščak Zagreb season was the second season for the Zagreb-based club in the Kontinental Hockey League. Initially Mark French was announced as head coach of the team, but prior to the season starting he accepted an offer from the Calgary Hitmen, a major junior team in the Canadian-based Western Hockey League. He was replaced by Chuck Weber, who in turn was relieved of his duties due to poor play by the team and succeeded by Doug Shedden. During the season Medveščak participated in the Spengler Cup, the first time the club was invited to play in the tournament.

Schedule and results

Regular season

|-bgcolor=ffbbbb
|1
|4
|Slovan Bratislava 
|5 - 2
|Medveščak Zagreb
|Slovnaft Arena
|10,055
|0-0-0-1
|
|-bgcolor=ffbbbb
|2
|6
|Avtomobilist Yekaterinburg
|3 - 2
|Medveščak Zagreb
|KRK Uralets
|3,550
|0-0-0-2
|
|-bgcolor=ffbbbb
|3
|8
|Ak Bars Kazan
|4 - 2
|Medveščak Zagreb
|TatNeft Arena
|5,647
|0-0-0-3
|
|-bgcolor=ffbbbb
|4
|10
|Metallurg Magnitogorsk
|6 - 0
|Medveščak Zagreb
|Magnitogorsk Arena
|6,145
|0-0-0-4
|
|-bgcolor=ddffdd
|5
|14
|Medveščak Zagreb
|5 - 2
|Severstal Cherepovets
|Dom sportova
|6,250
|1-0-0-4
|
|-bgcolor=ffbbbb
|6
|16
|Medveščak Zagreb
|1 - 4
|Torpedo Nizhny Novgorod
|Dom sportova
|5,000
|1-0-0-5
|
|-bgcolor=ffbbbb
|7
|18
|Medveščak Zagreb
|2 - 3
|CSKA Moscow
|Dom sportova
|5,800
|1-0-0-6
|
|-bgcolor=ddffdd
|8
|21
|Medveščak Zagreb
|5 - 1
|Lada Togliatti
|Dom sportova
|5,800
|2-0-0-6
|
|-bgcolor=ddffdd
|9
|24
|Slovan Bratislava 
|1 - 4
|Medveščak Zagreb
|Slovnaft Arena
|7,985
|3-0-0-6
|
|-bgcolor=ffbbbb
|10
|26
|Medveščak Zagreb
|1 - 3
|Slovan Bratislava 
|Dom sportova
|5,800
|3-0-0-7
|
|-bgcolor=ffbbbb
|11
|29
|Medveščak Zagreb
|1 - 5
|SKA Saint Petersburg
|Dom sportova
|5,800
|3-0-0-8
|
|-

|-bgcolor=ffbbbb
|12
|1
|Medveščak Zagreb
|0 - 5
|SKA Saint Petersburg
|Dom Sportova
|5,000
|3-0-0-9
|
|-bgcolor=ddffdd
|13
|3
|Medveščak Zagreb
|3 - 2
|Dinamo Riga 
|Dom sportova
|5,000
|4-0-0-9
|
|-bgcolor=ddffdd
|14
|6
|Jokerit 
|2 - 3
|Medveščak Zagreb
|Hartwall Areena
|9,351
|5-0-0-9
|
|-bgcolor=ffbbbb
|15
|8
|SKA Saint Petersburg
|5 - 2
|Medveščak Zagreb
|Ice Palace
|12,247
|5-0-0-10
|
|-bgcolor=ffbbbb
|16
|10
|Dinamo Riga 
|4 - 3
|Medveščak Zagreb
|Arena Riga
|5,480
|6-0-0-10
|
|-bgcolor=ffbbbb
|17
|12
|Atlant Mytishchi
|5 - 2
|Medveščak Zagreb
|Mytishchi Arena
|6,300
|6-0-0-11
|
|-bgcolor=ddffdd
|18
|14
|Medveščak Zagreb
|1 - 0
|Slovan Bratislava 
|Dom Sportova
|5,500
|7-0-0-11
|
|-bgcolor=d0e7ff
|19
|18
|HC Ugra
|1 - 2 OT
|Medveščak Zagreb
|Arena Ugra
|3,100
|7-1-0-11
|
|-bgcolor=ddffdd
|20
|20
|Traktor Chelyabinsk
|2 - 4
|Medveščak Zagreb
|Traktor Sport Palace
|5,800
|8-1-0-11
|
|-bgcolor=ffbbbb
|21
|22
||Lada Togliatti
|2 - 1
|Medveščak Zagreb
|Lada Arena
|5,420
|8-1-0-12
|
|-bgcolor=ffeeaa
|22
|24
|Neftekhimik Nizhnekamsk
|4 - 3 SO
|Medveščak Zagreb
|SCC Arena
|3,500
|8-1-1-12
|
|-bgcolor=ddffdd
|23
|28
|Medveščak Zagreb
|2 - 0
|Sibir Novosibirsk
|Dom Sportova
|5,000
|9-1-1-12
|
|-bgcolor=ffeeaa
|24
|29
|Medveščak Zagreb
|2 - 1 SO
|Metallurg Novokuznetsk
|Dom Sportova
|5,000
|9-2-1-12
|
|-bgcolor=ffbbbb
|25
|31
|Medveščak Zagreb
|3 - 4
|Admiral Vladivostok
|Dom Sportova
|5.650
|9-2-1-13
|
|-

|-bgcolor=ffbbbb
|26
|2
|Medveščak
|2 - 5
|Amur
|Dom Sportova
|6,100
|9-2-1-14
|
|-bgcolor=ffbbbb
|27
|5
|Barys Astana 
|4 - 1
|Medveščak
|Kazakhstan Sports Palace
|4,012
|9-2-1-15
|
|-bgcolor=ddffdd
|28
|7
|Metallurg Novokuznetsk
|2 - 3
|Medveščak
|Kuznetsk Palace
|3,275
|10-2-1-15
|
|-bgcolor=ffeeaa
|29
|12
|Slovan 
|1 - 2 SO
|Medveščak
|Slovnaft Arena
|8,728
|10-3-1-15
|
|-bgcolor=ddffdd
|30
|14
|Medveščak
|4 - 1
|Atlant
|Dom Sportova
|5,000
|11-3-1-15
|
|-bgcolor=ffbbbb
|31
|16
|Medveščak
|3 - 6
|Vityaz
|Dom Sportova
|5,500
|11-3-1-16
|
|-bgcolor=ffbbbb
|32
|19
|Medveščak
|2 - 5
|Dinamo Minsk 
|Dom Sportova
|5,500
|11-3-1-17
|
|-bgcolor=ffbbbb
|33
|22
|Medveščak
|1 - 3
|Jokerit 
|Dom Sportova
|6,200
|11-3-1-18
|
|-bgcolor=ddffdd
|34
|25
|Medveščak
|3 - 1
|Vityaz
|Dom Sportova
|4,500
|12-3-1-18
|
|-bgcolor=d0e7ff
|35
|27
|Medveščak
|3 - 4 OT
|Lokomotiv
|Dom Sportova
|4,500
|12-3-2-18
|
|-bgcolor=ffbbbb
|36
|29
|Dinamo Minsk 
|4 - 3
|Medveščak
|Minsk-Arena
|15, 086
|12-3-2-19
|
|-

|-bgcolor=ffeeaa
|37
|3
|Dinamo Moscow 
|2 - 3 SO
|Medveščak
|Luzhniki Arena
|4,107
|12-4-2-19
|
|-bgcolor=ffbbbb
|38
|5
|HC Sochi
|6 - 2
|Medveščak
|Bolshoy Ice Dome
|7,794
|12-4-2-20
|
|-bgcolor=ffbbbb
|39
|8
|Medveščak
|3 - 5
|Barys 
|Dom Sportova
|4,000
|12-4-2-21
|
|-bgcolor=ffbbbb
|40
|10
|Medveščak
|2 - 6
|Avangard
|Dom Sportova
|4.500
|12-4-2-22
|
|-bgcolor=ffbbbb
|41
|14
|Medveščak
|1 - 3
|Salavat Yulaev Ufa
|Dom Sportova
|5,200
|12-4-2-23
|
|-bgcolor=ddffdd
|42
|22
|Medveščak
|5 - 3
|Neftekhimik
|Dom Sportova
|5,200
|13-4-2-23
|
|-

|-bgcolor=ddffdd
|43
|4
|Medveščak
|5 - 4
|Slovan Bratislava 
|Dom Sportova
|5,754
|14-4-2-23
|
|-bgcolor=ddffdd
|44
|8
|Atlant
|2 - 3
|Medveščak
|Mytishchi Arena
|6,200
|15-4-2-23
|
|-bgcolor=ffeeaa
|45
|10
|Vityaz
|2 - 3 OT
|Medveščak
|Vityaz Ice Palace
|4,950
|15-5-2-23
|
|-bgcolor=ffbbbb
|46
|12
|Lokomotiv
|4 - 3
|Medveščak
|Arena 2000
|8,409
|15-5-2-24
|
|-bgcolor=d0e7ff
|47
|15
|Medveščak
|3 - 4 OT
|Dynamo Moscow
|Dom sportova
|5,000
|15-5-3-24
|
|-bgcolor=ffeeaa
|48
|17
|Medveščak
|3 - 2 OT
|Sochi
|Dom sportova
|6,250
|15-6-3-24
|
|-bgcolor=ffbbbb
|49
|20
|Medveščak
|2 - 3
|Atlant
|Dom sportova
|5,150
|15-6-3-25
|
|-bgcolor=ddffdd
|50
|22
|Medveščak
|4 - 2
|Dynamo Minsk 
|Dom sportova
|5,250
|16-6-3-25
|
|-bgcolor=ddffdd
|51
|28
|Jokerit 
|1 - 4
|Medveščak
|Hartwall Arena
|9,591
|17-6-3-25
|
|-bgcolor=ddffdd
|52
|30
|Dinamo Riga 
|1 - 2
|Medveščak
|Arena Riga
|8,390
|18-6-3-25
|
|-

|-bgcolor=ffbbbb
|53
|1
|SKA
|5 - 2
|Medveščak
|Ice Palace
|12,177
|18-6-3-26
|
|-bgcolor=ffbbbb
|54
|3
|Dynamo Minsk 
|3 - 2
|Medveščak
|Minsk-Arena
|13,810
|18-6-3-27
|
|-bgcolor=d0e7ff
|55
|11
|Severstal
|4 - 3 SO
|Medveščak
|Ice Palace
|2,500
|18-6-4-27
|
|-bgcolor=ffbbbb
|56
|13
|CSKA
|5 - 2
|Medveščak
|CSKA Ice Palace
|4,190
|18-6-4-28
|
|-bgcolor=ffbbbb
|57
|15
|Torpedo
|3 - 1
|Medveščak
|Trade Union Sport Palace
|5,500
|18-6-4-29
|
|-bgcolor=ffbbbb
|58
|17
|Vityaz
|3 - 1
|Medveščak
|Vityaz Ice Palace
|1,820
|18-6-4-30
|
|-bgcolor=ffbbbb
|59
|20
|Medveščak
|1 - 3
|Dinamo Riga 
|Dom Sportova
|5,700
|18-6-4-31
|
|-bgcolor=d0e7ff
|60
|22
|Medveščak
|4 - 5 SO
|Jokerit 
|Dom Sportova
|6,200
|18-6-5-31
|
|-

Tournaments

|-bgcolor=ffbbbb
|1
|27 December 2014
|Team Canada 
|1 - 3
|Vaillant Arena, Davos, Switzerland
|6,300
|0-1
| 
|-bgcolor=ffbbbb
|2
|28 December 2014
|HC Davos 
|0 - 1
|Vaillant Arena, Davos, Switzerland
|6,300
|0-2
| 
|-

|-bgcolor=ffbbbb
|3
|29 December 2014
|Salavat Yulaev Ufa 
|0 - 3
|Vaillant Arena, Davos, Switzerland
|5,934
|0-3
| 
|-

Player statistics
Last updated: 3 Mar, 2015.Source: Kontinental Hockey League.

Skaters

Goaltenders

Final roster

|}

Source: Eliteprospects.

Coaching staff
Head Coach:  Doug Shedden
Assistant Coach:  Dean Fedorchuk
Assistant Coach:  Alan Letang
Assistant Coach:  Ivo Ratej Jr.
Goalie Coach:  Klemen Mohorič

Roster changes
Source: eliteprospects.com

Players Joining

Players Leaving

Player signings
This is the list of all players that extended their contracts with Medveščak:

Players lost via retirement

Players eligible for the Croatian national ice hockey team

References

KHL Medveščak Zagreb seasons
Zagreb
Med